Adam Mogg (born 31 July 1977) is an Australian former professional rugby league footballer who played in the 2000s. A Queensland State of Origin representative , he played in the National Rugby League (NRL) for Australian clubs the Canberra Raiders and Parramatta Eels, as well as in the Super League for French club the Catalans Dragons.

Background
Mogg was born in Toowoomba, Queensland, Australia.

Playing career
Mogg spent five years with the Redcliffe Dolphins, participating in four grand finals in the Queensland Cup and winning the club's player of the year award in 2001, before being scouted in 2002 by the Parramatta Eels.  Mogg made his first grade debut for Parramatta in round 10 of the 2002 NRL season against Melbourne at Olympic Park.

In the 2003 season, the Canberra Raiders picked him up and he became a regular member of the squad.

Mogg scored two tries on his Origin debut and a further try in game III. He was one of the oldest players to make an Origin debut.

He was selected at centre in the 2007 season's Super League Dream Team. The Queenslander grew in confidence in 2008, and in May 2008 signed a contract extension which tied him to the Dragons until 2011.
 
On 22 March 2010 it was announced that Mogg had been released from his contract and would rejoin Canberra Raiders.

Mogg retired from the game at the end of 2010, scoring only one try for the season.

Coaching career
Mogg coached the Sunshine Coast Sea Eagles in the 2011 Queensland Cup. He was then involved with the Redcliffe Dolphins, before being signed by former teammate Andrew McFadden as an assistant coach for the New Zealand Warriors.

On 21 Oct 2021 it was reported that Mogg would leave the Redcliffe Dolphins club, after six seasons in charge as head-coach, making way for incoming coach Wayne Bennett.

Career highlights
 First Grade Debut - 2002, round 10 Parramatta v Melbourne Storm, Olympic Park, 18 May
 Representative Selection - 2006, two games for the Queensland Maroons, scoring three tries

References

External links

1977 births
Living people
Australian rugby league coaches
Australian rugby league players
Canberra Raiders players
Catalans Dragons players
Parramatta Eels players
Queensland Rugby League State of Origin players
Redcliffe Dolphins coaches
Redcliffe Dolphins players
Rugby league centres
Rugby league five-eighths
Rugby league halfbacks
Rugby league players from Toowoomba
Rugby league wingers